Dionte' Johnson (born June 28, 1986 in Columbus, Ohio) is a former American football fullback for the Arizona Cardinals of the National Football League. He was signed by the Cardinals as an undrafted free agent in 2008. He played college football at Ohio State. He was released by the Cardinals because of an ankle injury.

Johnson owns and operates Sole Classics, a sneakers boutique with locations in Columbus and Dublin, Ohio, and Kingsrowe, a clothing brand.

Personal
He is the son of former NFL linebacker Pepper Johnson and Monica Hawkins. Johnson's godfather, Keith Byars, is a former NFL running back for the Philadelphia Eagles, Miami Dolphins, New England Patriots and New York Jets.  Johnson was married in 2013 to Jessica Ingram.

External links
Arizona Cardinals bio
Ohio State Buckeyes bio
The Columbus Dispatch Article

1986 births
Living people
Players of American football from Columbus, Ohio
American football fullbacks
Ohio State Buckeyes football players
Arizona Cardinals players